Langi Veainu (born 3 November 1993) is a New Zealand rugby league and rugby union footballer.

She previously played for the New Zealand Warriors in the NRL Women's Premiership and has represented New Zealand in both codes.

Background
Born in Kawakawa, Veainu grew up in Christchurch before moving to Auckland with her family following the 2011 Christchurch earthquake.

Her older brother, Telusa, is a Tonga rugby union international.

Playing career

Rugby league
In 2016, while playing for the Papakura Sisters, Veainu represented Counties Manukau.

On 5 May 2017, she started on the wing for New Zealand in a 4–16 loss to Australia in Canberra.

On 1 August 2018, she was announced as a member of the New Zealand Warriors NRL Women's Premiership squad. In Round 1 of the 2018 NRL Women's season, she made her debut for the Warriors in a 10–4 win over the Sydney Roosters.

On 13 October 2018, she started on the wing and scored two tries for New Zealand in a 24–26 loss to Australia in Auckland.

Rugby union
In 2014, Veainu began playing for Counties Manukau in the Farah Palmer Cup.

In November 2019, she played for the Black Ferns Development XV at the Oceania Rugby Women's Championship in Lautoka, Fiji. She scored a try in their group game against Australia A and two against Papua New Guinea.

On 14 November 2020, she made her debut for the Black Ferns, scoring two tries in a 34–15 win over the New Zealand Barbarians in West Auckland.

References

External links
NRL profile
Black Ferns profile

1993 births
Living people
New Zealand sportspeople of Tongan descent
New Zealand female rugby league players
Australia women's national rugby league team players
New Zealand female rugby union players
Rugby league wingers
Rugby league centres
Rugby union wings
New Zealand Warriors (NRLW) players
Auckland rugby union players
People from Kawakawa, New Zealand